E-Land Puma FC is defunct South Korean semi-professional football club. The club was officially founded in December 1992, by the E-Land.

The club played in the Korean FA Cup in 1996 and 1997 against top division teams.

Honours

Domestic

Amateur
Korean President's Cup
 Champions (1): 1994
Korean National Football Championship
 Champions (2): 1994, 1995
 Runners-up (1) : 1996

Notable players
 Chung Jung-yong
 Park Kun-Ha
 Je Yong-sam
 In Chang-soo

See also
 Seoul E-Land FC

References

S
S
1992 establishments in South Korea
1998 disestablishments in South Korea
Works association football clubs in South Korea